Ernest Edwin Evans (August 13, 1908 – October 25, 1944) was an officer of the United States Navy who posthumously received the Medal of Honor for his actions during the Battle off Samar in World War II.

Biography
Evans, of Native American ancestry (half Cherokee and one quarter Creek), was born in Pawnee, Oklahoma and graduated from Muskogee Central High School. After one year of enlisted service in the Navy, he was appointed to the United States Naval Academy, entering as a Midshipman on June 29, 1927. He graduated from the academy in 1931.

On August 9, 1941, he was assigned to the destroyer , and was serving on her in the East Indies when the Japanese attacked Pearl Harbor on December 7 of that year. He became commanding officer of Alden on March 14, 1942, and held that position until July 7, 1943. While serving on Alden he participated in operations in and around Australia, New Guinea and the Dutch East Indies.

Commander Evans assumed command of Johnston at her commissioning on October 27, 1943, declaring to the assembled crew, "this is going to be a fighting ship. I intend to go in harm's way, and anyone who doesn't want to go along had better get off right now". He was awarded the Bronze Star for meritorious achievement in sinking the Japanese submarine I-176 on May 16, 1944.

Battle off Samar

In the Battle off Samar, a part of the Battle of Leyte Gulf, Evans led Johnston until it was sunk on October 25, 1944, by a Japanese force that was vastly superior in number, firepower, and armor. This group, together with planes from Taffy 2 (TU 77.4.2), ultimately forced a Japanese battlegroup consisting of 4 battleships, 6 heavy cruisers, 2 light cruisers and 11 destroyers to abort its original mission to attack the landing beaches at Leyte under the command of General Douglas MacArthur, and retreat. The famous battle has become known as "The Last Stand of the Tin Can Sailors", after the 2004 book of the same title.

When the Japanese fleet was first sighted, Evans did not hesitate. After laying a smoke screen to help hide the escort carriers from enemy gunfire, he ordered his helm hard to port and he led his destroyer out of the task unit's circular antiaircraft disposition in favor of charging the enemy alone to make a torpedo attack. Some claim that Evans told his crew over the ship's intercom: "A large Japanese fleet has been contacted. They are fifteen miles away and headed in our direction. They are believed to have four battleships, eight cruisers, and a number of destroyers. This will be a fight against overwhelming odds from which survival cannot be expected. We will do what damage we can."

The fate of Johnstons captain was never conclusively established, and remains the subject of continuing conjecture among the ship's survivors. Some say that he was hit by Japanese naval shellfire; others that he was able to jump into a damaged motor whaleboat. What is known is that he was seriously wounded during the battle; that he lived long enough to give the order to abandon ship; and that he was not among those rescued. Evans was posthumously awarded the Medal of Honor for his material contribution to the decisive victory won in Leyte Gulf, and shared in the Presidential Unit Citation awarded his group for this action in which he was killed.

Namesake
In 1955, the destroyer escort  was named in his honor. It was decommissioned in 1968, and no active ship carries the name of Evans or Johnston, although a number of active ships have been named for Samuel B. Roberts and her crew. On November 12, 2013, a petition was started to name a ship after Evans.

On May 23, 2013, the Naval Station Newport, Newport, Rhode Island, Surface Warfare Officers School's virtual simulator for shiphandling training was dedicated as the Evans Full Mission-2 Simulator in Evans' honor.

Awards

Medal of Honor citation

For conspicuous gallantry and intrepidity at the risk of his life above and beyond the call of duty as commanding officer of the U.S.S. Johnston in action against major units of the enemy Japanese fleet during the battle off Samar on 25 October 1944. The first to lay a smokescreen and to open fire as an enemy task force, vastly superior in number, firepower and armor, rapidly approached. Comdr. Evans gallantly diverted the powerful blasts of hostile guns from the lightly armed and armored carriers under his protection, launching the first torpedo attack when the Johnston came under straddling Japanese shellfire. Undaunted by damage sustained under the terrific volume of fire, he unhesitatingly joined others of his group to provide fire support during subsequent torpedo attacks against the Japanese and, outshooting and outmaneuvering the enemy as he consistently interposed his vessel between the hostile fleet units and our carriers despite the crippling loss of engine power and communications with steering aft, shifted command to the fantail, shouted steering orders through an open hatch to men turning the rudder by hand and battled furiously until the Johnston, burning and shuddering from a mortal blow, lay dead in the water after 3 hours of fierce combat. Seriously wounded early in the engagement, Comdr. Evans, by his indomitable courage and brilliant professional skill, aided materially in turning back the enemy during a critical phase of the action. His valiant fighting spirit throughout this historic battle will venture as an inspiration to all who served with him.

See also

List of Medal of Honor recipients for World War II

Notes

References

Audio/visual media
Lost Evidence of the Pacific: The Battle of Leyte Gulf. History Channel. TV. No writer given.
Dogfights: Death of the Japanese Navy. History Channel. TV. No writer given.

External links

1908 births
1940s missing person cases
1944 deaths
Battle of Leyte Gulf
Captains who went down with the ship
Military personnel from Oklahoma
Missing person cases in the Philippines
Native American United States military personnel
People from Pawnee, Oklahoma
People lost at sea
Recipients of the Navy Cross (United States)
United States Naval Academy alumni
United States Navy Medal of Honor recipients
United States Navy officers
United States Navy personnel killed in World War II
World War II recipients of the Medal of Honor